Carol(e) Miller may refer to:

People
 Carol Miller (author) (born 1933), American author and sculptor
 Carol Miller (politician) (born 1950), American politician from West Virginia
 Carol Miller (DJ) (born 1950), American disc jockey currently on WAXQ
 Carol Marbin Miller (born 1959), investigative reporter at The Miami Herald

Characters
 Carol Miller, a character in the film The Hidden
 Carole Miller, a character in the TV series Revenge
 Carol Miller née Carol Pilbasian, character in the TV series The Last Man on Earth
 Carol Miller, a.k.a. "Mom", a recurring antagonist on Futurama

See also
 Carol Miller Swain (born 1954), American political scientist